Agusan's at-large congressional district may refer to several occasions when a provincewide at-large district was used for elections to Philippine national legislatures from the formerly undivided province of Agusan.

Agusan was created as a special province from territories previously organized under Surigao and parts of Misamis in 1907. As a special province, Agusan was under the direct supervision of the Department of the Interior Bureau of Non-Christian Tribes and was unrepresented in the Philippine Assembly. In 1913, the province was transferred to the direct control and jurisdiction of the Department of Mindanao and Sulu whose representatives to the national legislature were appointed by the Governor General as one at-large district beginning with the 4th Philippine Legislature in 1916. In 1934 following the passage of the Tydings–McDuffie Act, Agusan elected its own delegate for the first time to the 1934 Philippine Constitutional Convention which was charged with the drafting of a new constitution for the Commonwealth of the Philippines. The province then began to send a representative to the Commonwealth National Assembly from its single-member at-large district created under the 1935 constitution.

Agusan was also represented in the Second Republic National Assembly during the Pacific War. It also elected a representative to the restored House of Representatives and to the first six congresses of the Third Philippine Republic. After the 1967 division of Agusan, the district was abolished and replaced by Agusan del Norte's and Agusan del Sur's at-large districts.

Representation history

See also
Legislative districts of Agusan del Norte
Legislative districts of Agusan del Sur

References

Former congressional districts of the Philippines
Politics of Agusan del Norte
Politics of Agusan del Sur
1935 establishments in the Philippines
1967 disestablishments in the Philippines
At-large congressional districts of the Philippines
Congressional districts of Caraga
Constituencies established in 1935
Constituencies disestablished in 1967